Yuri Andreevich Belov (31 July 1930 – 31 December 1991) was a Soviet film and theatre actor. He was one of the most popular actors of Soviet cinema in the 1950s and 1960s.

Biography and career
Yurii Belov was born July 31, 1930 in Rzhev (now - Tver Oblast). He spent his childhood in the Kuril Islands, as Yuri's father was a military man, and the last place of his service became the Far East.

He graduated from the VGIK (acting course of Boris Bibikov and Olga Pyzhova) in 1955. One year later he became famous for his role as Grisha in the film Carnival Night.

For the next seven years films were released with the actor one after another which consolidated his success among the audience and made Yuri Belov one of the most popular actors of the Soviet cinema. Some of the most popular films with him include The Girl Without an Address, Spring on Zarechnaya Street, The Unamenables, Queen of the Gas Station. In the last two films he played opposite Nadezhda Rumyantseva. Later he was an actor of National Film Actors' Theatre.

In the mid-1960s the actor was committed in a psychiatric hospital for six months, after which his career went downhill, he started to receive only episodic roles.

In the National Film Actors' Theatre he played Miloslavsky in the play "Ivan Vasilievich" written by Mikhail Bulgakov, which was one of his last notable roles in theatre. Subsequently, Belov left the National Film Actors' Theatre.

Belov played his last major role in the film Train Stop — Two Minutes (1972).

Because of his lack of demand as an actor, Belov worked as a driver on his car Moskvitch 402. He began to abuse alcohol, his health deteriorated with each passing year. In his latest film, Two and One (1988) Belov appeared in another minor role and was already seriously ill.

Yuri Belov died in the morning of December 31, 1991. He is buried at Kuntsevo Cemetery in Moscow, cemetery plot number 10.

Personal life
At the age of 40 Yuri Belov married actress Svetlana Shvaiko. In 1976 they had a son Svyatoslav.

Partial filmography

 Volnitsa (1956)
  (1956) as Pavel (uncredited)
 Spring on Zarechnaya Street (1956) as Yevgeny Ishchenko
 Carnival Night (1956) as Grisha Koltsov
 The Girl Without an Address (1957) as Mitya
  (1958) as Arkady
 May Stars (1959) as Probocník
 The Unamenables (1959) as Tolya Grachkin
  (1959) as Semyon
 Thirst (1959) as Vasya Rogozin 'Patefon'
  (1961) as Nikolay Savin
 Alyosha's Love (1961) as Arkadiy
  (1961)
  (1961) as Dmitriy Burmin
  (1962) as Journalist Sinkin
 Hussar Ballad (1962) as hussar-partisan
 Come Tomorrow, Please... (1962) as Volodya
 Queen of the Gas Station (1963) as Slavka
  (1963) as Sledovatel
 Come Here, Mukhtar! (1965) as Larionov
 Give me a complaints book (1965) as German
  (1965) as Aleksandr Streltsov
 Transitional Age (1969) as Mikhail Ivanovich
 Passing Through Moscow (1970) as Kolya
 Grandads-Robbers (1971) as Petya
 Nervy... Nervy... (1972) as Militiaman
 Train Stop — Two Minutes (1972, TV Movie) as Vasily Nazarovich
  (1973) as tovarishch Muratova
 Neylon 100% (1973) as Khabibullin
 Goaway and Twobriefcases (1974) as Yuriy Andreyevich
 Moi dorogiyeMoi dorogiye (1975) as Grigoriy Nikonorych
  (1976) as Ivanov
  (1977) as Taksist
 About the Little Red Riding Hood (1977, TV Movie) as Grandad
  (1979)
 The Woman who Sings (1979) as airplane passenger
  (1982)
 Moscow on the Hudson (1984) as Circus Clown
  (1988) (final film role)

Awards
Yuri Belov was winner of the All-Union Film Festival for his role in The Unamenables in the year 1960.

References

External links

1930 births
1991 deaths
Gerasimov Institute of Cinematography alumni
Soviet male film actors
Burials at Kuntsevo Cemetery